Delbert E. Philpott (September 24, 1923 – December 11, 2005) was an American soldier and scientist.

Born in Omro, Wisconsin, Philpott served in the Fighting 69th Infantry Division in World War II, and was one of three Americans in the iconic link-up photo by Allan Jackson of American troops shaking hands with Russian soldiers at the Elbe River in April 1945. Philpott was awarded the Bronze Star and the Purple Heart Medals for his service.

After the war, Philpott completed his bachelor's degree in Chemistry at Indiana University in 1948 and a master's degree in 1949. At the University of Illinois Medical School in Chicago he established the first electron microscope facility, before moving to the Marine Biological Lab and Institute for Muscle Research in Woods Hole, MA in 1952, where he was Head of Electron Microscopy, directing research projects under Nobel Laureate Albert Szent-Györgyi in the winter and for the Marine Biological Lab at Woods Hole during the summer.

Philpott was awarded his PhD in cytology in 1963 from Boston University, and moved to the University of Colorado as Professor of Biochemistry until 1966, when he became Head of the Department of Electron Microscopy and Co-Director of the Institute for Biomedical Research at Mercy Hospital in Denver.

He joined NASA as the head of the Ultrastructure Laboratory at the Moffett Field NASA Ames Research Center, inspecting lunar soil for any evidence of life. Experiments designed by Philpott were flown on both American and Russian spacecraft, including Apollo 17, Cosmos 736 and Cosmos 936. Philpott retired from NASA in 1990, but continued working under contract with the Lockheed Martin Company at NASA Ames. Philpott authored over 230 scientific papers and wrote articles for several books and magazines in his scientific career.

Philpott was one of ten veterans chosen as guests at the Russian government's 60th Anniversary Celebration of the end of World War II, seated at the table with President Putin and President Bush. He and his wife, Donna, also co-edited the book "Hands Across The Elbe", stories by American and Russian veterans about the link up in April 1945.

Notes

External links
Allies meet at Elbe photos from Corbis

1923 births
2005 deaths
People from Omro, Wisconsin
United States Army personnel of World War II
Indiana University alumni
University of Illinois Chicago people
Boston University alumni
University of Colorado faculty